Iran have appeared in the FIFA World Cup on six occasions: in 1978, 1998, 2006, 2014, 2018 and 2022. They are yet to have progressed from the group stages.

Record at the World Cup

Argentina 1978

Group 4

France 1998

Group F

Germany 2006

Group D

Brazil 2014

Group F

Russia 2018

Group B

Qatar 2022
Simultaneous to the Mahsa Amini protests in Iran, the team declined to sing the national anthem prior to their match with England. Prior to the match, captain Ehsan Hajsafi, said that the team support protestors.

Group B

By match

Records

Most appearances

Most goals

References

External links 
 Profile at thesoccerworldcups.com
 FIFA Match Results for all Stages 1930–2006
 FIFA official site

 
Countries at the FIFA World Cup
World Cup